is a Japanese manga series written and illustrated by Nagabe. It was serialized in Mag Garden's  manga magazine Monthly Comic Garden from September 2015 to March 2021, with its chapters collected into eleven  volumes. The manga is licensed in North America by Seven Seas Entertainment.

A 10-minute original animation DVD (OAD) adaptation by Wit Studio was released with the limited edition of the manga's eighth volume in Japan in September 2019. A feature-length OAD, also by Wit Studio, was released with the manga's bonus volume in March 2022.

Plot
Shiva, an eccentric young girl, is abandoned in a forest filled with beasts that can inflict heavy curses in one touch. Shiva meets a beast who is much nicer than the others whom she calls Teacher. Teacher tells Shiva that her aunt is coming to get her while in reality, Shiva's "auntie", as Shiva calls her, was the one who abandoned her. Shiva sneaks away to find her auntie but soldiers from the human-inhabited area outside the forest find her and assume that Shiva is a monster in disguise. Teacher saves Shiva, but she still has so many questions. In the middle of the night, Shiva awakens to find that a beast, hoping to curse Shiva, has snuck into the house. The beast touches Shiva, inflicting its curse on her. Teacher finds the beast and gets rid of it, but that night, Shiva dreams she is searching for her auntie. In Shiva's dream, her arm slowly turns into a black, webbed claw.

Characters

Media

Manga
The Girl from the Other Side: Siúil, a Rún was written and illustrated by Nagabe. It was serialized in Mag Garden's  manga magazine Monthly Comic Garden, beginning in the October 2015 issue on September 6, 2015. It ended in the April 2021 issue on March 5, 2021. Mag Garden collected the chapters into eleven  (compiled volumes), published under its Blade Comics imprint from March 10, 2016, to April 9, 2021. A bonus manga volume was published on March 10, 2022.

The series is licensed for an English-language release in North America by Seven Seas Entertainment. It is also licensed in France by Komikku Éditions, in Italy by J-Pop, in Spain by ECC Cómics, in Brazil by DarkSide Books, and in Russia by Istari Comics.

Original animation DVDs
A 10-minute OVA adaptation was released with the limited edition of the manga's eighth volume in Japan on September 10, 2019. It was directed by Yūtarō Kubo and Satomi Maiya, and produced by Wit Studio, who "test[ed] a type of animation that uses a 'new expression technique'" in its creation. Prior to the OVA's release, the animated short premiered at the Fantasia International Film Festival in Montreal, Canada, on August 1, 2019. It was also screened at the Scotland Loves Anime Film Festival in Glasgow, Scotland, on October 12, 2019, and streamed online by the Japanese Film Festival and the JFF Plus Online Film Festival in various countries in December 2020.

On March 5, 2021, it was announced that Wit Studio would produce a new, feature-length OVA, to be released with a bonus volume of the manga on March 10, 2022. The staff members of the first OVA will return to reprise their roles. A Kickstarter campaign to raise funds for the project ran from March 10 to May 9, 2021. The campaign met its initial million goal on the first day. It exceeded its million stretch goal on the final day.

Reception

Manga
The Girl from the Other Side: Siúil, a Rún won the "Shōnen Tournament 2017" by the editorial staff of the French website manga-news. It was nominated for the Best Comic award at the 45th Angoulême International Comics Festival in 2018. The first volume was included on the list of Great Graphic Novels for Teens selected by the American Library Association's YALSA division in 2018; the third, fourth, and fifth volumes were included on the same list in 2019.

Film
The feature-length film was nominated for the Feature Films Competition at the 9th New Chitose International Animation Film Festival in 2022. Additionally, the short-length film competed in the Films/Videos Made for Young Audiences category of the Ottawa International Animation Festival's digital event in 2020.

References

External links
 "Review – Exploring Relationship in a Gothic Setting in Nagabe's The Girl From the Other Side" at The Beat
 
  (10-minute OVA)
  (70-minute OVA)
 Official site

2015 manga
2019 anime OVAs
2022 anime OVAs
Dark fantasy anime and manga
IG Port franchises
Mag Garden manga
Mystery anime and manga
OVAs based on manga
Seven Seas Entertainment titles
Shōnen manga
Wit Studio